Kikuchi, often written 菊池 or 菊地, may refer to:

Places
 Kikuchi, Kumamoto
 Kikuchi River, Kumamoto
 Kikuchi District, Kumamoto

People
 Kikuchi (surname)
 Kikuchi clan
 Yoshihiko Kikuchi
 Yusei Kikuchi

Other
 Kikuchi disease, a rare, non-cancerous enlargement of the lymph nodes
 Kikuchi line (solid state physics), a line in an electron diffraction pattern for a crystal
 Kikuchi Line (Kumaden), a railway line in Kumamoto Prefecture connecting Kami-Kumamoto Station to Miyoshi Station